Kamensky District is an administrative and municipal district (raion), one of the forty-three in Rostov Oblast, Russia. It is located in the west of the oblast. Its administrative center is the urban locality (a work settlement) of Gluboky. Population: 47,696 (2010 Census);  The population of Gluboky accounts for 20.7% of the district's total population.

References

Notes

Sources

Districts of Rostov Oblast